The Victorian Railways J class was a branch line steam locomotive operated by the Victorian Railways (VR) between 1954 and 1972. A development of the successful Victorian Railways K class 2-8-0, it was the last new class of steam locomotive introduced on the VR. Introduced almost concurrently with the diesel-electric locomotives that ultimately superseded them, the locomotives were only in service for a relatively short time.

History
During the early 1950s, the Victorian Railways (VR) embarked on a massive upgrading of its ageing locomotive fleet as part of Operation Phoenix, an £80 million program to rebuild a network badly run down by years of underinvestment during the Great Depression, and the heavy workload imposed by World War II.

Victoria's branch line railway network, laid with  rail and featuring gradients of up to 1 in 30 (3.33%), was still largely served by the D1, D2 and D3 variants of the once 261-strong 1902-era Dd class 4-6-0 which, by the early 1950s, were at the end of their life. The new J class locomotives were supplemented by 53 K class locomotives, some of which had been built as recently as 1946. Consequently, the building of further K class was not a feasible option.

With mainline electric and diesel-electric locomotives already on order, the VR design team opted for an updated, gauge-convertible K class, which would turn out to be their final steam locomotive design.

Design features

The key problem with the K class design was the placement of the firebox between the locomotive frame and rear driving wheels, making conversion to a narrower gauge impossible without a radical redesign of the firebox. A previous attempt to develop a gauge-convertible K class, the N class, utilised a 2-8-2 wheel arrangement and positioned the firebox above the frames and behind the driving wheels.

The J class also featured a number of other design advances over the K class. It had a larger grate, enabling grate sections to be compatible with those of the N class and permitting an increase in firebox volume sufficient to allow two arch tubes to be installed. Another innovation was the use of a regulator valve incorporating a centrifugal steam separator (to draw away any water and thus provide the driest steam), rather than the simpler (though extremely reliable) D regulator valve used in the K class. The J class also featured  substantially redesigned cylinder porting to improve steam flow and efficiency. The innovative SCOA-P type driving wheel centre developed for the Victorian Railways R class was adapted for the  diameter J class drivers.

The high-set boiler, together with the German-style smoke deflectors, gave the J class a distinctly European appearance.

Production
A total of fifty J class locomotives were initially ordered from the Vulcan Foundry in Lancashire, England. However, the VR reassessed its motive power requirements and opted to sell 10 of its brand-new, second-generation N class locomotives to the South Australian Railways, and increased the J class order to 60. At the time of order, the per-unit cost of the locomotives was £36,000 ($72,000) each.

With fluctuating oil prices and an unreliable supply of coal in the early 1950s, the VR appeared to take something of a bet either way, ordering thirty of the class as coal burners and thirty as oil burners.

By the time the contract for the J class had been awarded, the VR had already begun to receive deliveries of the B class mainline diesel-electric locomotives, and it unsuccessfully attempted to cancel the J class contract in favour of an order for branch line diesel locomotives.

Service
The J class was introduced for both passenger and goods traffic on Victoria's branch line network, with a maximum permissible speed of 45 mph (72 km/h), later raised to 50 mph (80 km/h). Dynamometer car tests showed the locomotive developed  at the drawbar at around 20–25 mph (32–40 km/h), which suited the relatively low speed limits of much of the Victorian branch line network.

Coal-fired J class locomotives were the regular engine on the 09:00 Melbourne to Yarram passenger service, with other duties being from Lilydale to Warburton and local services from Spencer Street to Werribee. The oil-fired J was also pressed into service hauling the final leg of The Gippslander express from Sale to Bairnsdale. In their later years, J class locomotives also ran the Horsham to Dimboola leg of the morning service from Melbourne, one of the last regular steam-hauled passenger train services in Victoria.

Although J class locomotives produced the same nominal tractive effort as the K or N class, they had a slightly higher adhesive weight (and so a better factor of adhesion) and were permitted to haul heavier loads on gradients. They could be found in goods service on branch lines across the state, but were also found on mainlines, running roadside goods services.

Within a year of the introduction of the J class, the T class diesel electric locomotive was also introduced. Although the VR did not publicly indicate the T was intended to replace the J class, the T class proved to be such a successful design that further orders of that locomotive class were made during the late 1950s and 1960s, and T class units gradually displaced the J class from many of the latter's normal duties.

Design Improvements

Following recommendations from the 1957 Australian and New Zealand Railway Conference, locomotive J546 was selected for the installation of a Laidlaw-Drew oil firing system in place of the convention weir-type burner. However, the locomotive was found to steam poorly under load using the Laidlaw-Drew system and was converted back to weir burner operation. No further locomotives were converted.

Demise
By the late 1960s, the J class was largely relegated to shunting at various country yards, with many losing their cowcatchers and gaining shunter's steps on sides of the tender. The introduction of the Y class diesel electrics saw the J class even superseded in that role and, in November 1967, J523 became the first J class to be scrapped. Scrappings continued until June 1978, with J538 the last to go. J550 holds the distinction of being the very last steam locomotive in normal revenue service on the Victorian Railways, being rostered on the 6 a.m. Bendigo pilot on 25 May 1972.

Preservation

The J class lasted as a complete class later than any other VR steam locomotive class. By the time that J class scrapping commenced, interest in railway preservation was sufficient for eleven examples to be preserved.

Operational
J549: Owned and operated by the Victorian Goldfields Railway, the locomotive was out of service between March 2004 and October 2013, undergoing a major overhaul. It underwent load trials along the Maldon branch line on 21 October 2013, and its first public outing was on 26 October 2013. The official re-launch of the engine was held on 27 January 2014.

Under Restoration
J515: Owned by Seymour Railway Heritage Centre and loaned to Victorian Goldfields Railway in December 2006, it was returned to service April 2012 after two years out of traffic due to boiler repairs. It was returned to Seymour Railway Heritage Centre in January 2015 for an overhaul.
J541: Transferred to Newport Workshops April 2012, after its lease to Victorian Goldfields Railway ended. Whilst at Newport Workshops, repairs and maintenance was to be carried out by Steamrail Victoria, prior to its transfer to a new home at Yarra Valley Tourist Railway. It is owned by a private syndicate, which includes Yarra Valley Railway members and the railway itself.

Static
J507 is plinthed at Mulwala, New South Wales.
J512 is owned by Seymour Railway Heritage Centre and is awaiting restoration. As part of the restoration, it is to be converted from broad to standard gauge. , the engine frames had been converted.
J516 is owned by the Yarra Valley Tourist Railway. In June 2009, it was being stripped down for a restoration assessment.
J524 is plinthed at Donald.
J536 was plinthed at Colac station until 1998. It was acquired by West Coast Railway (WCR) in 1997 and taken to Ballarat East for restoration. Following the demise of WCR, the loco was sold to heritage group 707 Operations for eventual restoration to operating service, and moved to Newport Workshops.
J539 is plinthed at Dimboola
J550 was plinthed at Warragul until 24 March 2013. It is now on public display at Noojee, ahead of a planned restoration to working order.
J556, is preserved at the Newport Railway Museum in Newport, Victoria, wearing the historically significant plates of scrapped J559, the last steam locomotive to enter service on the VR.

Model Railways

HO scale
Steam Era Models has produced a brass and white metal kit for the J Class steam locomotive, as items L9C and L9O for Coal and Oil-burning models respectively.

Trainbuilder has released a ready-to-run brass model of the class, featuring numbers J500, 502, 508, 510, 518, 520, 523 as Coal Burners, and 531, 535, 538, 541, 544, 552, 555 and 558 as Oil Burners.

Ixion Models have released a ready-to-run plastic model, featuring numbers J500, J506, J507, J515, J519, J525 as Coal Burners, and J535, J541, J544, J549, J554, J556 as Oil Burners.

References

External links
Details and further photographs of J class locomotives

Railway locomotives introduced in 1954
J class
Vulcan Foundry locomotives
2-8-0 locomotives
Broad gauge locomotives in Australia